Memento z banalnym tryptykiem is the ninth studio album by the progressive rock band SBB.

It was the band's last album before its disbanding in 1980, and was actually released in 1981, after the band had already split up. They would only reunite much later to record new music again.

Recording 
The album was recorded in Polskie Nagrania Muza. During the recording, the band was supported by a second guitarist, Sławomir Piwowar, and Józef Skrzek's brother , who plays the harmonica.

After finishing recording, the band broke up.

Content 
Memento represents a refreshing of the band's sound. "Moja ziemio wyśniona" draws from the jazz fusion scene.

"Trójkąt radości" is dominated by Piwowar's guitars.

"Strategia pulsu" continues the trend of fusion-inspired tracks, as well as displaying the band's proficiency in "boogie-funk".

The title suite covers the entire second side of the album.

The album is bookended by excerpts from Lob der Frauen by Johann Strauss.

Track listing 
Credits adapted from liner notes.

Original LP

2005 bonus tracks

Release 

The album was released on 16 February 1981, after the band had already split up.

The album has been reissued several times on CD, including by Metal Mind Productions and Yesterday.

Reception and legacy 

Memento z banalnym tryptykiem was considered to be the group's best Polish album since their debut.

In 2017, a poll of Radiowa Trójka listeners ranked the title suite as the 24th best Polish song of all time.

Personnel 
Credits adapted from liner notes.

 Józef Skrzek – keyboards (piano, polymoog, minimoog, micromoog, sonicsix moog, Hammond organ, clavinet, davolishint, Fender piano, concert spectrum), contrabass, banjo, cowbell, singing
 Apostolis Anthimos – acoustic guitar, electric guitar
 Jerzy Piotrowski – drums, percussion
 Sławomir Piwowar – acoustic guitar, electric guitar, clavinet, Fender piano
  – harmonica

References 

1981 albums
SBB (band) albums